Davion is a given name and surname. Notable people with the name include:

Given name
Davion Berry (born 1991), American basketball player
Davion Davis (born 1997), American football player
Davion Mintz (born 1998), American football player
Davion Mitchell (born 1998), American basketball player
Davion Taylor (born 1998), American football player

Surname
Alexander Davion (1929–2019), French-born British actor
Antoine Davion, French missionary
Geoffrey Davion (1940–1996), English actor